Xiaolong is a Chinese given name and may refer to:

Chen Xiaolong (born 1988), Ashton Chen, stage name Shi Xiaolong, Chinese actor and martial artist
Li Xiaolong (1940–1973), known as Bruce Lee, Hong Kong-American actor, director, martial artist, martial arts instructor and philosopher
Liang Xiaolong (born 1948), Hong Kong actor who has appeared in many martial arts movies
Liu Xiaolong (born 1988), male Chinese badminton player who is a doubles specialist
Liu Xiaolong (footballer) (born 1989), Chinese football player
Qiu Xiaolong (born 1953), English-language poet, literary translator, crime novelist, critic, and academic
Wang Xiaolong (born 1986), Chinese footballer
Wang Xiaolong (artist) (born 1965), contemporary Chinese painter and designer
Wang Xiaolong (handballer) (born 1989), Chinese handball player who competed in the 2008 Summer Olympics
Xu Xiaolong (born 1992), Chinese triple jumper
Xu Xiaolong (footballer) (born 1989), Chinese footballer
Yin Xiaolong (born 1985), Chinese football player
Zhang Xiaolong, also known as Allen Zhang, Chinese programmer known for creating WeChat and Foxmail
Zheng Xiaolong (born 1953), Chinese TV and film director and screenwriter

See also
Xiaolongbao, type of Chinese steamed bun (baozi) from the Jiangnan region
CAC FC-1 Xiaolong, a lightweight, single-engine, multi-role combat aircraft
Xiaolongnü, fictional female protagonist of the wuxia novel The Return of the Condor Heroes by Jin Yong